The 2003 FedEx Express season was the second season of the franchise in the Philippine Basketball Association (PBA).

Draft picks

Occurrences
April 15: PBA Commissioner Noli Eala ordered the FedEx management to honor the remainder of Rene "Bong" Hawkins' four-year contract which the ballclub assumed from the disbanded Tanduay Rhum Masters, the contract is worth P400,000 a month. 

May 20: FedEx appeals before the PBA board on the earlier decision after cager Bong Hawkins reportedly turned down a P2.7 million settlement offered by the team.

September 12: Express' coaching consultant Bonnie Garcia was elevated to the position of head coach, replacing Derrick Pumaren.

Roster

Game results

All-Filipino Cup

Transactions

Additions

Subtractions

References

Barako Bull Energy seasons
FedEx